Tikkurila station  is located in Tikkurila, the administrative centre of Vantaa in the Helsinki metropolitan area. The station is considered the main railway station of Vantaa, and almost all long-distance and commuter trains stop here. 

Tikkurila was one of the first seven railway stations in Finland constructed together with the country's first railway between Helsinki and Hämeenlinna in 1862. It was also the only one apart from the two terminus stations to be built out of brick and not wood. The old station was converted into a museum in the 1970s, and a new, more modern station was built to the north of the old one.

Connections 
The station is a local transportation hub. Bus services include local neighbourhood service by a minibus and various connections inside Vantaa as well as regional services to Helsinki. Among the more important services running via Tikkurila station is the service 562 (N), which connects the station to the Jumbo shopping centre, Aviapolis, and Flamingo in the west to Hakunila, Jakomäki and Mellunmäki (metro station) in the east on a 24-hour-basis.

Since the completion of the Ring Rail Line it offers a fairly frequent rail connection to Helsinki-Vantaa Airport some 5 km to the west of the station as well western parts of Vantaa with the northbound I-train service. Other rail connections included daily trains to Moscow and St. Petersburg. All southbound services end at the Helsinki Central railway station.

Services 
The station bridge and the Dixi centre offer a number of services to commuters, tourists and the public in general.

References

External links
 

Railway stations in Vantaa
Railway stations opened in 1862
1862 establishments in Finland